In mathematics, in particular in mathematical analysis, the Whitney extension theorem is a partial converse to Taylor's theorem.  Roughly speaking, the theorem asserts that if A is a closed subset of a Euclidean space, then it is possible to extend a given function of A in such a way as to have prescribed derivatives at the points of A. It is a result of Hassler Whitney.

Statement 
A precise statement of the theorem requires careful consideration of what it means to prescribe the derivative of a function on a closed set.  One difficulty, for instance, is that closed subsets of Euclidean space in general lack a differentiable structure.  The starting point, then, is an examination of the statement of Taylor's theorem.

Given a real-valued Cm function f(x) on Rn, Taylor's theorem asserts that for each a, x, y ∈ Rn, there is a function Rα(x,y) approaching 0 uniformly as x,y → a such that

where the sum is over multi-indices α.

Let fα = Dαf for each multi-index α.  Differentiating (1) with respect to x, and possibly replacing R as needed, yields

where Rα is o(|x − y|m−|α|) uniformly as x,y → a.

Note that may be regarded as purely a compatibility condition between the functions fα which must be satisfied in order for these functions to be the coefficients of the Taylor series of the function f.  It is this insight which facilitates the following statement:

Theorem.  Suppose that fα are a collection of functions on a closed subset A of Rn for all multi-indices α with  satisfying the compatibility condition at all points x, y, and a of A.  Then there exists a function F(x) of class Cm such that:
 F = f0 on A.
 DαF = fα on A.
 F is real-analytic at every point of Rn − A.

Extension in a half space
 proved a sharpening of the Whitney extension theorem in the special case of a half space. A smooth function on a half space Rn,+ of points where xn ≥ 0 is a smooth function f on the interior xn for which the derivatives ∂α f extend to continuous functions on the half space. On the boundary xn = 0, f restricts to smooth function. By Borel's lemma, f can be extended to a  
smooth function on the whole of Rn. Since Borel's lemma is local in nature, the same argument shows that if  is a (bounded or unbounded) domain in Rn with smooth boundary, then any smooth function on the closure of  can be extended to a smooth function on Rn.

Seeley's result for a half line gives a uniform extension map

which is linear, continuous (for the topology of uniform convergence of functions and their derivatives on compacta) and takes functions supported in [0,R] into functions supported in [−R,R]

To define  set

where φ is a smooth function of compact support on R equal to 1 near 0 and the sequences (am), (bm) satisfy:

A solution to this system of equations can be obtained by taking  and seeking an entire function

such that  That such a function can be constructed follows from the Weierstrass theorem and Mittag-Leffler theorem.

It can be seen directly by setting

an entire function with simple zeros at  The derivatives W '(2j) are bounded above and below. Similarly the function

meromorphic with simple poles and prescribed residues at 

By construction

is an entire function with the required properties.

The definition for a half space in Rn by applying the operator R to the last variable xn. Similarly, using a smooth partition of unity and a local change of variables, the result for a half space implies the existence of an analogous extending map

for any domain  in Rn with smooth boundary.

See also 

 The Kirszbraun theorem gives extensions of Lipschitz functions.

Notes

References

Theorems in analysis